Shepherd Dome is a low dome-shaped mountain at the north side of Pine Island Glacier, standing 4 miles (6 km) southwest of Mount Manthe in the south part of the Hudson Mountains. It was mapped from air photos made by U.S. Navy Operation Highjump in 1946–47. It was named by the Advisory Committee on Antarctic Names (US-ACAN) for Donald C. Shepherd, an ionospheric physicist at Byrd Station in 1967.

Hudson Mountains
Mountains of Ellsworth Land
Volcanoes of Ellsworth Land